The 1981 season in Swedish football, starting January 1981 and ending December 1981:

Honours

Official titles

Competitions

Promotions, relegations and qualifications

Promotions

Relegations

International qualifications

Domestic results

Allsvenskan 1981

Allsvenskan qualification play-off 1981

Division 2 Norra 1981

Division 2 Södra 1981

Division 2 qualification play-off 1981 
1st round

2nd round

Svenska Cupen 1980–81 
Final

National team results

Notes

References 
Print

Online

 
Seasons in Swedish football